This is a list of members of the Diet of Japan. The Diet has two chambers: the House of Councillors (upper house) and the House of Representatives (lower house). Councillors serve six year terms, with half being elected every three years. Representatives serve terms of up to four years, but the House of Representatives can be dissolved, causing a shorter term (snap election).

House of Representatives

Composition

List of members by parliamentary group and constituency. There are usually translations and abbreviations for  used on the English pages of the House of Representatives website,
 LDP 
 Kōmeitō 
 CDP 
 DPFP 
 JCP 
 Nippon Ishin 
 Group of Independents 
 SDP 
 Kibo 
 Independents

Notes:
 Not all members of a parliamentary group are necessarily members of the associated party/parties if any, and vice versa. For example, the Speaker and Vice-Speaker of the House of Representatives are independents in terms of parliamentary group membership, but not independents in terms of party membership.
 The count of terms as given by the House of Representatives follows the usual way of counting them in Japan by number of won elections (tōsen kaisū) which is not necessarily identical to election periods of the House of Representatives. For example, former member Nobutaka Machimura served for two terms as a member during the (2009–2012) 45th election period of the House of Representatives: one as member for the Hokkaidō proportional constitutency from the general election in August 2009 to his resignation in September 2010, and one as member for constituency number 5 in Hokkaidō from the by-election in October 2010 to dissolution in November 2012. Among other things, the election count determines the seating within a parliamentary group, the more senior members by this measure sit in the back.
 Most proportional members of the House of Representatives have been deleted.

House of Councillors

Composition 

List of members by parliamentary group and constituency. There are usually translations and abbreviations for parliamentary groups (会派 kaiha, current House of Councillors website translation: "In-House Group") used on the English pages of the House of Representatives website
 The official caucus names are transcribed to Latin here:
 LDP 
 Kōmeitō 
 CDP 
 DPFP 
 Ishin 
 JCP 
 Reiwa 
 SDP 
 PPPNHK 
 Independents 
Notes:
 Not all members of a caucus are also members of the affiliated party, and sometimes even some members of a party are not member of the affiliated caucus.
 The N→S column allows to sort by prefecture from North to South in the order generally used in Japan (also used as number identifier for prefectures [JP-##] in ISO 3166-2).
 Due to a 2015 reapportionment, some districts are represented by an uneven number of members until the regular 2019 election, when it becomes effective in both halves.

Members

References

External links

See also 

 Member of Parliament (Japan)

Japan Diet